Nicolás Fernando Lauría Calvo (born May 27, 1974 in Santa Fe (Province of Santa Fe), Argentina) is a former Argentine football player and played in clubs of Argentina and Chile.

Teams 
  Argentinos Juniors 1988-1996
  Banfield 1996
  Colón de Santa Fe 1997
  Colo-Colo 1997-1998
  Arsenal de Sarandí 1998-1999
  Juventud Antoniana 1999-2000

References 
 
 Profile at Futbol XXI  

1974 births
Living people
Argentine footballers
Argentine expatriate footballers
Argentinos Juniors footballers
Arsenal de Sarandí footballers
Juventud Antoniana footballers
Club Atlético Colón footballers
Club Atlético Banfield footballers
Colo-Colo footballers
Chilean Primera División players
Argentine Primera División players
Expatriate footballers in Chile
Association football forwards
Footballers from Santa Fe, Argentina